Pan Wei-lun (born 5 March 1982 in Pingtung County, Taiwan) is a Taiwanese professional baseball pitcher for the Uni-President Lions of the Chinese Professional Baseball League (CPBL).

Career
After brief amateur career in the Taiwan Cooperative Bank baseball team he was drafted by the Uni-President Lions of the Chinese Professional Baseball League in early 2003 and remains with this team to date. He has been considered an ace for the Lions and has also been a key member of the Chinese Taipei national baseball team since 2002.

He held the CPBL record of pitcher with the longest winning streak by scoring 21 victories between March 1, 2007 and June 18, 2008. Furthermore, he scored his first career no-hitter on July 10, 2008 against Chinatrust Whales, but failed to achieve perfect game due to a fielding error by first baseman Kao Kuo-ching.

International career
Pan represented Chinese Taipei in the 2004 Olympic Game. He, along with Wang Chien-Ming, were the only two Taiwanese pitchers to have wins in the tournament. He was credited with two wins.

Pan represented Chinese Taipei in the 2008 Olympic Game. He had no wins or losses in the tournament.

Career statistics

Last updated December 6, 2010

References

1982 births
Living people
Asian Games gold medalists for Chinese Taipei
Asian Games medalists in baseball
Asian Games silver medalists for Chinese Taipei
Baseball players at the 2002 Asian Games
Baseball players at the 2004 Summer Olympics
Baseball players at the 2006 Asian Games
Baseball players at the 2008 Summer Olympics
Baseball players at the 2010 Asian Games
Fu Jen Catholic University alumni
Medalists at the 2002 Asian Games
Medalists at the 2006 Asian Games
Medalists at the 2010 Asian Games
Olympic baseball players of Taiwan
People from Pingtung County
Taiwanese expatriate baseball players in Japan
Uni-President 7-Eleven Lions players
Uni-President Lions players
2006 World Baseball Classic players
2013 World Baseball Classic players
2015 WBSC Premier12 players
2017 World Baseball Classic players